Umiujaq Airport  is a public airport located near the town of Umiujaq, Quebec, Canada. It is operated by the Kativik Regional Government since late 1996.

Airlines and destinations

References

External links

Certified airports in Nord-du-Québec